Route 660, or Highway 660, may refer to:

Canada
 Saskatchewan Highway 660

Ireland
 R660 road (Ireland)

United Kingdom
 A660 road

United States
 Nevada State Route 660 (former)
 Ohio State Route 660
 Pennsylvania Route 660
 Puerto Rico Highway 660